Grishino is a rural locality (a selo) in Fominskoye Rural Settlement, Gorokhovetsky District, Vladimir Oblast, Russia. The population was 263 as of 2010. There are 5 streets.

Geography 
Grishino is located 41 km southwest of Gorokhovets (the district's administrative centre) by road. Rotkovo is the nearest rural locality.

References 

Rural localities in Gorokhovetsky District
Gorokhovetsky Uyezd